The Last Tasmanian is a 1978 documentary about the decline of Tasmania's Aboriginal people in the nineteenth century including through genocide by European colonists.

The film was highly controversial in Australia, in particular for criticism by contemporary Aboriginal Tasmanians that the film suggested Tasmanian Aboriginal culture had been eradicated.

The Last Tasmanian screened widely internationally to acclaim, including receiving a nomination for the Gold Hugo at the Chicago International Film Festival, and was sold to television in twenty-two countries.

References

External links 
 

1978 documentary films
1978 films
Documentary films about Aboriginal Australians
Australian documentary films
1970s English-language films